Richard E. Webber is a retired United States Air Force major general. He was the first commander of the Twenty-Fourth Air Force, which is focused on cyberspace operations. The Twenty-Fourth Air Force is located in San Antonio, Texas, and stood up in place of the originally proposed larger Major Command organization, Air Force Cyber Command. Webber graduated from the United States Air Force Academy in 1975 and has worked in the space and missile career field.

Assignments
 February 1976 – October 1980, missile combat crew member, instructor missile deputy combat crew commander, instructor missile combat crew commander, wing emergency war order planner and instructor, and emergency rocket communication system emergency war order instructor, 351st Strategic Missile Wing, Whiteman Air Force Base, Missouri
 October 1980 – October 1981, Air Staff Training Program officer, Strategic Missile Division and Force Analysis Division, Air Force Studies and Analysis, Washington, D.C.
 November 1981 – August 1984, Chief, Future Intercontinental Ballistic Missile Systems Branch, Directorate of Plans and Operations, Headquarters Strategic Air Command, Offutt AFB, Nebraska
 August 1984 – June 1985, student, College of Command and Staff, Naval War College, Newport, R.I.
 June 1985 – April 1989, missile operations staff officer, Strategic Offensive Force Division, Air Force Plans Directorate, Washington, D.C.
 April 1989 – July 1991, Commander, 508th Strategic Missile Squadron, Whiteman AFB, Missouri
 August 1991 – August 1992, student, Industrial College of the Armed Forces, Washington, D.C.
 August 1992 – July 1994, Chairman, Allied Data Systems Interoperability Agency, and Chief, Systems Interoperability Branch, Headquarters North Atlantic Treaty Organization and International Military Staff, Brussels, Belgium
 July 1994 – July 1995, Commander, 341st Support Group, Malmstrom AFB, Montana
 July 1995 – July 1996, Commander, 341st Operations Group, Malmstrom AFB, Montana
 July 1996 – October 1997, Commander, 321st Missile Group, Grand Forks AFB, North Dakota
 October 1997 – June 1999, Vice Commander, Aerospace Command and Control & Intelligence, Surveillance and Reconnaissance Center, Langley AFB, Virginia
 June 1999 – April 2001, Commander, 50th Space Wing, Schriever AFB, Colorado
 April 2001 – April 2002, Inspector General, Air Force Space Command, Peterson AFB, Colorado (October 2001 – March 2002, Assistant Combined Air Operations Center Director for Space and Information Warfare, Prince Sultan Air Base, Saudi Arabia)
 April 2002 – August 2002, Deputy Director, Operations, Headquarters AFSPC, Peterson AFB, Colorado
 August 2002 – February 2003, Director, Communications and Information Systems, and Chief Information Officer, Headquarters AFSPC, Peterson AFB, Colorado
 February 2003 – March 2004, Director, Logistics and Communications, Chief Information Officer and Chief Sustainment Officer, Headquarters AFSPC, Peterson AFB, Colo. (March 2003 – May 2003, Deputy Director of Operations for Space and Information Operations, U.S. Central Command, Southwest Asia)
 March 2004 – November 2005, Commander, 21st Space Wing, Peterson AFB, Colorado
 November 2005 – January 2008, Director of Installations and Mission Support, Headquarters AFSPC, Peterson AFB, Colorado
 January 2008 – August 2009, Assistant Deputy Chief for Air, Space and Information Operations, Plans and Requirements, Headquarters U.S. Air Force, Washington, D.C.
 August 2009 – April 2011, Commander Twenty-Fourth Air Force, Lackland AFB, Texas

Effective dates of promotion
 Second Lieutenant: June 4, 1975
 First Lieutenant: June 4, 1977
 Captain: June 4, 1979
 Major: Aug. 1, 1984
 Lieutenant Colonel: July 1, 1988
 Colonel: Jan. 1, 1992
 Brigadier General: Jan. 1, 2002
 Major General: July 14, 2006

References

External links
 Official Air Force biography

Living people
Naval War College alumni
Recipients of the Air Force Distinguished Service Medal
Recipients of the Defense Superior Service Medal
Recipients of the Legion of Merit
United States Air Force Academy alumni
University of Missouri alumni
Year of birth missing (living people)